OPN may stand for:

Osteopontin, a glycoprotein secreted by osteoblasts
Object Process Network, a simulation model meta-language
Optics & Photonics News, a magazine
Oneohtrix Point Never, recording alias of musician Daniel Lopatin
Olivary pretectal nucleus, a nucleus in the pretectal area, or pretectum
In mathematics, odd perfect number
 Ora pro nobis, Latin phrase litt. meaning "pray for us", often abbreviated as OpN in prayer books and breviaries
Yamaha YM2203, a sound chip